Adil Shamasdin (born May 23, 1982) is a Canadian professional tennis player who specialises in doubles. He reached his highest doubles ranking of world No. 41 on June 26, 2017.

Tennis career
Shamasdin's junior career saw him finish ranked No. 5 in singles and No. 1 in doubles in Canada. In his senior career, he has won so far three ATP World Tour doubles titles, in 2011 at the SA Tennis Open with James Cerretani, in 2015 at the Grand Prix Hassan II with Rameez Junaid and in 2017 at the Lyon Open with Andrés Molteni. He also has won twenty ATP Challenger Tour doubles titles and seven ITF Futures doubles titles.  In 2015 in the Davis Cup World Group quarterfinals, he was selected to play his first tie for Canada, losing the doubles match with Daniel Nestor. The next year in the Davis Cup World Group playoffs, he helped his country secure its place in the World Group by winning the match with Vasek Pospisil. In 2016, he reached the quarterfinals at Wimbledon with Jonathan Marray as wildcards, beating the fourth seeds and defending champions Jean-Julien Rojer and Horia Tecău in the opening round, and the fifteenth seeds Pablo Cuevas and  Marcel Granollers in the third round. They were defeated by the twelfth seeds Treat Huey and Max Mirnyi. Also in 2016, he advanced to the ATP Masters 1000 Rogers Cup second round for the first time of his career, after six unsuccessful attempts. In the first round, he and compatriot Philip Bester defeated the pair of then world No. 1 singles player Novak Djokovic and Nenad Zimonjić, before losing to the seventh seeds Raven Klaasen and Rajeev Ram in their next match.

Personal life
Shamasdin grew up in Pickering, Ontario. His parents Kamru and Rozi immigrated to Canada from Kenya. He has two brothers Jamil and Irfan. He attended Brown University in Rhode Island and graduated with a degree in psychology. Shamasdin broke the record for the most combined wins (singles and doubles) in Brown tennis history with over 220.

ATP career finals

Doubles: 6 (3 titles, 3 runners-up)

Challenger and Futures finals

Doubles: 61 (31–30)

Doubles performance timeline

This table is current through the 2021 Singapore Tennis Open.

References

External links

Brown Bears profile

1982 births
Living people
Brown Bears men's tennis players
Canadian male tennis players
Canadian people of Kenyan descent
People from Pickering, Ontario
Tennis players from Toronto